Kaohsiung earthquake may refer to:

2010 Kaohsiung earthquakes
2016 Kaohsiung earthquake

See also
List of earthquakes in Taiwan